Colin Bennett may refer to:

Col Bennett (1919–2002), Australian politician
Colin Bennett (actor), English actor, writer, and producer
Colin Bennett (soccer) (born 1950), Australian football player
Colin Emerson Bennett (1908–1993), Canadian politician and lawyer
Colin Bennett, spaceflight participant on Virgin Galactic Unity 22

See also
Colin Bennetts (1940–2013), English clergyman, bishop of Coventry
Cole Bennett (born 1996), American videographer and business executive
Bennett (name)